Sherman N. Smith Jr. (June 13, 1914 – January 7, 1998) was an American judge and politician. He served as a Democratic member of the Florida House of Representatives.

Life and career 
Smith was born in Crossville, Tennessee. He served in the United States Navy during World War II.

Smith was an attorney in Indian River County, Florida. In 1953, he was elected to the Florida House of Representatives, serving until 1956, when he was succeeded by Louis B. Vocelle.

In 1961, Smith was elected to serve as a judge for the Florida Second District Court of Appeal, serving until 1965, when he was elected to the Florida Fourth District Court of Appeal, serving until 1967.

Smith was married to Joyce, with whom he raised three children. He died in January 1998 at the Indian River Memorial Hospital, at the age of 83.

References 

1914 births
1998 deaths
People from Crossville, Tennessee
Democratic Party members of the Florida House of Representatives
20th-century American politicians
Florida state court judges
20th-century American judges
Judges of the Florida District Courts of Appeal